Stockton Hall is a building on the campus of George Washington University in Washington, D.C.  It was listed on the District of Columbia Inventory of Historic Sites in 1987 and on the National Register of Historic Places in 1991.

History
The building was designed by Albert L. Harris and Arthur B. Heaton in the Colonial Revival style and completed in 1926.  Wardman Construction Company built the structure.  It was the second building built on the Foggy Bottom campus after Corcoran Hall.  The structure is named after Charles Herbert Stockton, a Rear Admiral in the United States Navy who served as the GW President from 1910 to 1918.  It serves the George Washington University Law School.

Architecture
Stockton Hall is a concrete and steel frame structure covered in red brick and sandstone.  A cupola is featured in the center of the roof.  It is similar in style to Corcoran Hall, across University Yard to the west.  It rises four-stories from the ground.  The building is flanked by two classroom buildings that were built in the post modern style.

See also
H.B. Burns Memorial Building
Fulbright Hall 
Madison Hall 
Munson Hall
Jacqueline Bouvier Kennedy Onassis Hall
Hattie M. Strong Residence Hall

References

Buildings and structures completed in 1926
1926 establishments in Washington, D.C.
University and college buildings on the National Register of Historic Places in Washington, D.C.
Colonial Revival architecture in Washington, D.C.
George Washington University buildings and structures
Foggy Bottom